Show Time is a Doris Day album, primarily consisting of well-known songs from Broadway musicals, released by Columbia Records on July 11, 1960, as a monaural LP album, catalog number CL-1470, and a stereophonic LP album, catalog number CS-8261. Axel Stordahl was the conductor and the cover photographer was Bob Willoughby.

The album was combined with Day's 1963 album, Love Him, on a compact disc, issued on November 14, 2000 by Collectables Records.

Track listing

1960 albums
Doris Day albums
Albums conducted by Axel Stordahl
Columbia Records albums